Lagdo Reservoir is a lake located in the Northern Province of Cameroon. The lake covers an area of 586 km.

History
The Lagdo dam was built between 1977 and 1982 by a combination of engineers and Chinese workers, along with Cameroonian labourers. The company that managed the construction was the China International Water & Electric Corp. International power company AES Sonel runs the hydroelectric dam.

Location
The dam is located 50 km south of the city of Garoua on the Benue River. Its construction was intended to supply electricity to the northern part of the country and allow the irrigation of 15,000 hectares of crops downstream. The dam is 308 m long, 40 m in height and 9 m thick.  The dam is located within the Arrondissement de Lagdo in the Département de la Benoué in the North Province.

Floods
In 2012, water released from the dam flooded areas including Adamawa State in Nigeria, resulting in more than 10 deaths and the loss of properties worth thousands of dollars. A bigger effect of the flooding was at the lower Benue river region where more than 10,000 homes were submerged for more than two weeks. This left more than 10,000 hectares of farmland flooded and the streets of Makurdi occupied by crocodiles and other dangerous creeping creatures.

In September 2022, According to Dr Sulieman Muhammad, the Executive Secretary of the Adamawa State Emergency Management Agency, 25 people died in the state and farmland was submerged due to floods brought by the discharge of water from the Lagdo Dam in Cameroon.

References

Lakes of Cameroon
North Region (Cameroon)